The Dyestuffs (Import Regulation) Act 1920 (10 & 11 Geo. V c. 77) was an Act passed by the British Parliament. It came into effect on 15 January 1921 and it prohibited all imports of dyes except for special cases for ten years, although it was subsequently extended.

Notes

United Kingdom Acts of Parliament 1920
Economic history of the United Kingdom
Dyes
Foreign trade of the United Kingdom